Seyyed Kola (also Romanized as Şeyyed Kolā, Seyyed Kalā, and Seyyed Kolā) is a village in Natel-e Restaq Rural District, Chamestan District, Nur County, Mazandaran Province, Iran. At the 2006 census, its population was 966, in 241 families.

References 

Populated places in Nur County